Albania intends to open an embassy in Baku and Azerbaijan has accredited its ambassador in Athens with the additional position of Ambassador to Albania.

Both nations are predominantly Muslim and are part of the Organisation of Islamic Cooperation and the Council of Europe. Relations between the two countries were established on the 23 September 1992 after Azerbaijan achieved independence from the Soviet Union.

Relations 
Albania and Azerbaijan have developing economic and cultural ties. Albania supports the territorial integrity of Azerbaijan and an end to the occupation of Azerbaijani territories by neighbouring states including Armenia.

On 26 November 2019, an earthquake struck the Durrës region of Albania. The Azerbaijani government donated 
500,000 euros for humanitarian aid to Albania.

Economic relations

Imports and exports

References

See also 
 Foreign relations of Albania
 Foreign relations of Azerbaijan 
 Albanians in Azerbaijan
 Azerbaijanis in Albania

 
Azerbaijan
Albania